Shane Wright may refer to:
Shane Wright (ice hockey), ice hockey player
Shane Wright (rugby league), rugby league footballer